Alen Pol Kobryn, (born 29 September 1949 in Utica, NY) is an American poet, novelist, and voice actor.

Kobryn was educated at Johns Hopkins and New York University, and studied with John Ashbery at the City University of New York.

His work has been published by Scribner, Dell, and New English Library, and has been broadcast on WBAI, where Kobryn hosted Big Al's Literary Salon & Pool Hall while also working with Charles Ruas in the Drama and Literature Department.

... and other prisons, a novel, was first represented by Kurt Hellmer.

Framework, verse, and Attica State, a work in verse, were first broadcast on WBAI.

Poseidon's Shadow, a novel projecting the theme of the Iliad in cold war terms, published by Scribner, contains one of the earliest references to the existence of stealth technology.

Kobryn also performs voice over and character work, having first performed, as well as produced, at WBAI in 1976, since which time he has lent his voice to such varied projects as PBS's Nova and the Asymmetric Warfare Group.

Kobryn, who lives in New York, has recently collaborated with composer Wang Jie, and is thought to be preparing to end his long artistic silence.

References

External links
 Alen Pol Kobryn's Official Site
 

1949 births
Living people
20th-century American novelists
Johns Hopkins University alumni
New York University alumni
21st-century American novelists
20th-century American poets
21st-century American poets
American male novelists
American male poets
20th-century American male writers
21st-century American male writers